David Ogden is the name of:

David Ogden (politician) (born 1944), mayor from 2004 to 2010 of Hutt City in the Wellington region of New Zealand
David Ogden (conductor) (born 1966), English composer and choral conductor
David Ogden (wrestler) (born 1968), British Olympic wrestler
David A. Ogden (1770–1829), U.S. Representative from New York
David Ayres Depue Ogden (1897–1969), United States Army lieutenant general
David W. Ogden (born 1953), American lawyer and former Deputy Attorney General

See also
David Ogden Stiers (1942–2018), American actor, voice actor and musician